is a Kōya-san Shingon temple in Naruto, Tokushima Prefecture, Japan.  Temple 2 of the Shikoku 88 temple pilgrimage, the main image is of Amida Nyorai. The temple is said to have been founded by Gyōki.

Treasures
 Heian period seated wooden statue of Amida Nyorai (Important Cultural Property)
 Mandala of the Two Realms (Prefectural Cultural Property)
 Cryptomeria said to have been planted by Kōbō Daishi (City Cultural Property)

See also

 Shikoku 88 temple pilgrimage

References

Buddhist pilgrimage sites in Japan
Buddhist temples in Tokushima Prefecture
Kōyasan Shingon temples
Naruto, Tokushima